Ronaldo Porlares Aquino, CPA (December 5, 1961 – March 8, 2021) was a Filipino accountant and politician who served as mayor of the city of Calbayog, Samar. He and his three companions were assassinated in March 8, 2021.

Early life and career 
Aquino was born in Calbayog, Samar. He earned his Bachelor of Science in Accountancy at University of the East - Manila and became a certified public accountant before entering politics in 1992

He served as vice mayor of the city from 1995  to 2001 and 2004 until 2011. Upon the assassination of mayor Reynaldo Uy, he took the position and was sworn in as the mayor of the city from 2011 until his murder on March 8, 2021.

Death 
In 2011, his predecessor, mayor Reynaldo Uy was killed by a sniper during a formal program at Hinabangan town when during that time, Aquino was the vice-mayor. On March 8, 2021, Aquino, including 5 others, was also killed suffering 21 gunshot wounds in his entire body during a shoot-out with police in a "mistaken encounter" as authorities initially claimed.

References 

1961 births
2021 deaths
Assassinated Filipino politicians
Mayors of places in Samar (province)
People from Calbayog